1 Peter 3 is the third chapter of the First Epistle of Peter in the New Testament of the Christian Bible. The author identifies himself as "Peter, an apostle of Jesus Christ" and the epistle is traditionally attributed to Peter the Apostle, but some writers argue that it is the work of Peter's followers in Rome between 70 and 100 CE.

Text
The original text was written in Koine Greek. This chapter is divided into 22 verses.

Textual witnesses
Some early manuscripts containing the text of this chapter are:
In Greek
Papyrus 72 (3rd/4th century)
Papyrus 81 (4th century; extant verses 1, 4–12).
Codex Vaticanus (325–50)
Codex Sinaiticus (330–60)
Codex Alexandrinus (400–40)
Codex Ephraemi Rescriptus (c. 450; complete)
Papyrus 74 (7th century; extant verses 4–5)
In Latin
León palimpsest (7th century; extant verses 1–14)

Old Testament references
 : Psalm .
 1 Peter 3:14: Isaiah 8:12

Attitude to the family (3:1–7)
Wives, just as slaves in the last part of chapter 2, were two vulnerable groups. Commentator Eric Eve suggests that the advice directly concerns their welfare but it is also indirectly employed to offer examples of proper submission for Christians.

Wives, likewise, be submissive to your own husbands.
The words are addressed generally to all Christian wives but with special reference to those who have unbelieving husbands. However, 'Christianity gave dignity to the status of both', and here Peter teaches 'the spiritual equality of man and wife as heirs together', just as Paul also guides married couples towards 'mutual submission', where 'the wife's submissiveness is to be matched by the husband's self-giving love', thus complementing each other.

Attitude to the fellowship (3:8–12)
Peter concludes the sections of special relationships with the exhortation of the attitudes Christian should display to one another.

Verse 9
Do not repay evil for evil or reviling for reviling, but on the contrary, bless, for to this you were called, that you may obtain a blessing.
"Bless" (a verb in present participle form; KJV: "blessing"): means 'the calling down of God's gracious power and love on all people', including those doing evil to us.
"May obtain" (ESV; Greek: , ; an active verb): or "should inherit" (KJV)

Suffering for doing good (3:13–17)
To follow Christ's example of unjust suffering does not mean 'passivity', but an 'active doing of good' (='doing right').

Verse 13
If you are trying hard to do good, no one can really hurt you.

Verse 14
But even if you should suffer for righteousness' sake, you are blessed. "And do not be afraid of their threats, nor be troubled."
Cited from Isaiah 8:12b

Verse 15
But sanctify the Lord God in your hearts, and always be ready to give a defense to everyone who asks you a reason for the hope that is in you, with meekness and fear;
 "Sanctify the Lord God in your hearts": Referring to Isaiah 8:13; not by making God holy (which is unnecessary), but by proclaiming and declaring His holiness (cf. the seraphim in the Book of Isaiah, or the four living creatures in the Book of Revelation). The Arabic version reads, "bless the Lord God in your hearts." The Alexandrian, and one of Stephens's manuscripts, read, "sanctify the Lord Christ", as also in the Latin Vulgate and Syriac versions; for Christ is apparently the one intended in Isaiah 8:13 as concluded from  compared with Romans 9:33; 1 Peter 2:8
"Defense" (Greek: apologia): Christians should always be ready to give a defense, in word as well as action, for Christian faith (summarized here as "hope", cf. ,,).
 "A reason for the hope that is in you": Theologian John Gill regards the "hope that is in the saints" (the Syriac version here calls the "hope of faith") as "the Gospel" or the whole Christian doctrine, that is, the doctrine of faith, and the profession of Christianity (cf. "the profession of hope" in ), in which Christians profess their hope of eternal life and happiness through Christ. As a "reason" for this "hope" is to be given, believers should know well the ground and foundation of the Christian religion. 
"With meekness and fear": The giving of a defense is to be done with "meekness", in an humble modest way; not to provoke or irritate, and with "fear" of God (the Ethiopian version reads, "with the fear of the Lord") considering the subject and importance of the argument, and how much the honor of God is concerned in it, that no part of truth be dropped or concealed in order to please men, as was displayed before the Sanhedrin by Stephen, or before Antonius Felix, Porcius Festus, and Agrippa, by the Paul the Apostle. This reason, or answer, is to be given to everyone, who asks in a modest manner and with respect appropriate to the subject; as the phrases, "with meekness and fear", can be for the person who asks the reason, as well as the one who gives the answer; so that 'which is holy is not to be given to dogs', to impudent persons, mockers and scoffers, nor are 'pearls to be cast before swine', to irreverent persons (see Matthew 7:6). The Alexandrian manuscripts and some others, including the Vulgate Latin version, read, "but with meekness and fear". This is in agreement to the advice of R. Eleazar:
be diligent to learn the law, and know what thou shouldest answer to an Epicure.

Christological grounding (3:18–22)
Jesus really died in his humanity when being 'put to death in the flesh', so 'made alive in the spirit' does not mean that a "part" of Christ survived death, but that 'God raised Christ to a new life in the divine realm' (cf. ;).

Verse 18
For Christ also suffered once for sins, the righteous for the unrighteous, that he might bring us to God, being put to death in the flesh but made alive in the spirit,
David Wheaton regards this verse as one of the 'most succinct and yet profound statements in the New Testament on the doctrine of the atonement', in which Jesus has repaired the broken relationship between God and the humanity in three ways:
 by being the perfect offering for sins (cf.), fulfilling the requirements of the law.
 by enduring the death penalty imposed on sinners due to unrighteousness according to the law (cf. Romans 6:23)
 by removing the barrier caused by sins and opening for humans a way back to God (John 14:6).
Jesus is the one person whose perfect righteousness means that he never deserves to die, but he endured the punishments (the pains of death) and took the place for (lit. "on behalf of") all the unrighteous (KJV: "unjust") people, who did deserve to die, so thereby satisfying all God's own demands for reconciliation (an act of propitiatory and also vicarious; cf. ).

Verse 19

By which also he went and preached unto the spirits in prison;
"The spirits in prison" refers to the days of Noah, whose 'experience of salvation' is very similar to "baptism".

See also
 Abraham
 Books of the Bible
 Noah
 Sarah
 Jesus Christ
 Related Bible parts: Genesis 6, Psalm 34, Psalm 110, Isaiah 8, Ephesians 5, Colossians 3

References

Sources

External links

 King James Bible - Wikisource
English Translation with Parallel Latin Vulgate
Online Bible at GospelHall.org (ESV, KJV, Darby, American Standard Version, Bible in Basic English)
Multiple bible versions at Bible Gateway (NKJV, NIV, NRSV etc.)

1 Peter 3